Pleurochrysis carterae is a marine species of unicellular coccolithophorid algae that has the ability to calcify subcellularly. They produce calcified scales, known as coccoliths, which are deposited on the surface of the cell resulting in the formation of a coccosphere. Pleurochrysis carterae produce heterococcoliths which are composed of crystal units of variable shapes and sizes.

See also 
Algaculture
 Vitamin B12

External links 
wwwlib.murdoch.edu.au THE CULTURE OF COCCOLITHOPHORID ALGAE FOR CARBON DIOXIDE BIOFIXATION (pdf) 
webs.uvigo.es INHIBITION OF CRYSTAL GROWTH IN COCCOLITH FORMATION OF PLEUROCHRYSIS CARTERAE BY A POTENT SCALE INHIBITOR, (1-HYDROXYETHYLIDENE) BISPHOSPHONIC ACID (HEBP)(pdf)
adsabs.harvard.edu Pleurochrysis Carterae: a Model to Study Biologically Directed Mineralization in Space (pdf)

High lipid content microalgae
Haptophyte species